Muhammad Faishal bin Ibrahim Khan Surattee (Jawi: محمد فااشال إبراهيم; born 16 June 1968) is a Singaporean politician who has been serving as Minister of State for Home Affairs and Minister of State for National Development concurrently since 2020. A member of the governing People's Action Party (PAP), he has been the Member of Parliament representing the Nee Soon Central division of Nee Soon GRC since 2011.

Before entering politics, Faishal was an associate professor at the National University of Singapore's Department of Real Estate. He made his political debut in the 2006 general election as part of a six-member PAP team contesting in Marine Parade GRC and they won by an uncontested walkover. Faishal thus became a Member of Parliament representing the Kaki Bukit ward of Marine Parade GRC. During the 2011 general election onwards, he joined the PAP team contesting in Nee Soon GRC and they had won every general election since then. In 2012, he was appointed Parliamentary Secretary and had since risen through the ranks to become a Minister of State in 2020.

Background 
Faishal was educated at Telok Kurau East Primary School, Bedok South Primary School, Bedok View Secondary School and Nanyang Junior College. He then went to the National University of Singapore (NUS), where he completed a Bachelor of Science (Honours) in real estate management in 1993. In 1996, he completed a Master of Science in real estate management at NUS and graduated as the best overall student in his cohort. In 2000, he completed a Doctor of Philosophy in management science at the University of Manchester Institute of Science and Technology under a NUS Overseas Graduate Scholarship.

Faishal began his career at the Inland Revenue Authority of Singapore in 1993 after obtaining his bachelor's degree. After completing his master's degree in 1996, he joined the NUS Department of Real Estate as a Senior Tutor. In 2000, he became an Associate Professor at the NUS Department of Real Estate.

Political career 
Faishal entered politics when he joined a six-member People's Action Party (PAP) team contesting in Marine Parade GRC during the 2006 general election. After the PAP team won by an uncontested walkover, Faishal became a Member of Parliament representing the Kaki Bukit ward of Marine Parade GRC.

During the 2011 general election, Faishal joined the five-member PAP team contesting in Nee Soon GRC and they won with 58.4% of the vote against the Workers' Party. Faishal thus became a Member of Parliament representing the Nee Soon Central ward of Nee Soon GRC. On 1 August 2012, he was appointed Parliamentary Secretary at the Ministry of Health and Ministry of Transport.

Faishal contested in the 2015 general election in Nee Soon GRC again as part of a five-member PAP team, who won with 66.83% of the vote against the Workers' Party. On 1 October 2015, he was appointed Parliamentary Secretary at the Ministry of Education and Ministry of Social and Family Development. On 1 May 2017, he was promoted to Senior Parliamentary Secretary and continued serving at those two Ministries.

During the 2020 general election, Faishal joined the five-member PAP team contesting in Nee Soon GRC and they won with 61.90% of the vote against the Progress Singapore Party. On 27 July 2020, Faishal was promoted to Minister of State and appointed to the Ministry of National Development and Ministry of Home Affairs.

Personal life 
Faishal is married and has two children.

References

External links 
 Muhammad Faishal Ibrahim on Parliament of Singapore

Members of the Parliament of Singapore
People's Action Party politicians
Academic staff of the National University of Singapore
Alumni of the University of Manchester Institute of Science and Technology
National University of Singapore alumni
Nanyang Junior College alumni
Living people
Singaporean people of Malay descent
Singaporean Muslims
1968 births